William Jackson Creel (April 11, 1881 – November 8, 1970) was a three-term Democratic mayor of Eau Gallie, Florida from 1913 to 1915 and from May 1950 to December 1950. He was a member of the Florida House of Representatives in 1927.

He and his wife Jessie came from Bayard, Florida to Eau Gallie, Florida in 1910.  He was the trustee, along with William H. H. Gleason of the Eau Gallie School and Eau Gallie Junior and Senior High School.  Dr. W. J. Creel Elementary School, in the Eau Gallie area of Melbourne, Florida, is named after him.  In 1955, the main bridge of the Eau Gallie Causeway was named for him. Creel Street in the Eau Gallie area of Melbourne, Florida is also named after him.

See also 
 List of members of the Florida House of Representatives from Brevard County, Florida

References

Melbourne Bicentennial Book. July 4, 1976. Noreda B. McKemy and Elaine Murray Stone. Library of Congress 76-020298
Melbourne and Eau Gallie.  Karen Relay and Anne Relay Flotte. 2002. Arcadia Publishing. Charleston, SC. 
Eau Gallie Historical Trail

External links
Dr. W. J. Creel Elementary School

1881 births
1970 deaths
Physicians from Florida
Mayors of Melbourne, Florida
Democratic Party members of the Florida House of Representatives
People from Georgia (U.S. state)
20th-century American politicians
People from Eau Gallie, Florida